Muriel Evelyn Chamberlain (November 1932 - 8 February 2022) was emeritus professor of history at the University of Wales, Swansea (later called Swansea University). She was a specialist in European colonisation and de-colonisation and British foreign policy in the nineteenth century. Chamberlain was one of the general editors of the Historical Association Studies book series, vice-chair of the Historical Association and editor of its journal The Historian.

In 1975 she became the first woman to reach the role of dean at the university, in 1987 was promoted to professor and in 1989 was voted into her first term as head of the history department. She  retired in 1997 and continued to write books and articles. She died in 2022.

As well as her specialist interest in the British empire and Commonwealth history, she wrote the first biography of George Hamilton-Gordon, 4th Earl of Aberdeen, a politician who was Prime Minister from 1852 until 1855. She chaired the trustees of the Cambrian Archaeological Association for many years and was President of the society in 2003.

Selected publications
Britain and India: The Interaction of Two Peoples. David & Charles, London, 1974. (Library of Policy & Society) 
The Scramble for Africa. Longman, London, 1974. (Seminar Studies in History) 
British Foreign Policy in the Age of Palmerston. Longman, London, 1980. (Seminar Studies in History) 
The New Imperialism. The Historical Association, London, 1981.
Lord Aberdeen: A Political Biography. Addison-Wesley, 1983. 
Lord Palmerston. Catholic University of America Press, 1988. (Political Portraits) 
"Pax Britannica"? British Foreign Policy 1789-1914. Longman, London, 1988. (Studies in Modern History) 
Decolonization: The Fall of the European Empires. Blackwell, Oxford, 1985. (2nd 1999) (Historical Association Studies) 
The Longman Companion to European Decolonization in the Twentieth Century. Longman, London, 1998. (Longman Companions to History) 
Longman Companion to the Formation of the European Empires, 1488-1920. Routledge, London, 2014. (Longman Companions to History)

References 

1932 births
2022 deaths
British historians
Academics of the University of Wales
Historians of the British Empire
British women historians